Birmingham and Derby Junction Railway Locomotives comprised 
twelve passenger locomotives (ordered 1838) and two goods locomotives (ordered 1841). When the Birmingham and Derby Junction Railway (B&DJR) amalgamated with the Midland Counties Railway and the North Midland Railway to form the Midland Railway (MR) in May 1844, the former B&DJR locomotives were given MR numbers; previously, they had been named, but not numbered. Most were renumbered in February 1847.

Locomotive summary

Passenger
Wheel arrangement was 2-2-2. All had 12 inch by 18 inch cylinders and 5 foot 6 inch driving wheels. First to be delivered in 1839 were those from Mather Dixon, with 'Tamworth' being used for the inaugural run.
 Mather, Dixon and Company, Liverpool: 'Barton','Tamworth' and 'Hampton'.
 Charles Tayleur and Company, The Vulcan Foundry,  Newton-le-Willows: 'Derby', 'Burton', 'Birmingham'.
 R and W Hawthorn Ltd, Newcastle upon Tyne: 'Anker','Tame', Blythe'
 Sharp, Roberts and Company, Manchester: 'Derwent, 'Trent', 'Dove'.

Goods
Wheel arrangement was 0-4-2. These had 5 foot driving wheels.
 Thompson & Cole, Little Bolton,: 'Kingsbury', 'Willington'.

Stock list

References

External links
The Birmingham and Derby Junction Railway

Locomotives by railway
2-2-2 locomotives
0-4-2 locomotives
Midland Railway locomotives